Penn-Can Mall was a mall in the town of Cicero, New York, north of Syracuse. It opened on March 28, 1976. It was the first enclosed mall on the north end of Syracuse, and the fourth mall to be built in the entire metropolitan area. It was constructed by the Winmar Company of Seattle, Washington, and had room for 86 stores. At the mall's inception, only 28 stores were open, but the other spaces quickly followed, followed by even more during an expansion in 1986, putting the mall's store count to 121. The mall also had a smaller upper level with a few small shops and a Loews Cinema.  There was also an old European clock in the center court of the mall. Today the mall, including its clock, is home to a multi-franchise "auto mall" known as Driver's Village.

Building design
The mall opened in 1976. It was built in a straight line, and later it was in a "T" shape following the expansion. Originally, it was anchored by Sears, with a Hills added at the opposite end in 1983; another wing with Chappell's was added in 1986. Local department stores Addis & Company and Dey Brothers also had junior-anchor locations, and the mall included a three-screen movie theater.

Wilmorite entered a partnership with the Eagan family, the mall's original owners, in 1989. The Wilmorite company built another mall, Great Northern Mall in Clay, in 1988. Both Sears and Chappell's moved to Great Northern, with Steinbach and Caldor replacing their respective stores at Penn-Can. The Pyramid Companies opened its Carousel Center nearby in 1990, further increasing competition against Penn-Can. After Steinbach closed, it was replaced with a Burlington Coat Factory in 1993. Caldor replaced the Chappell's a year later, following the opening of Caldor stores at other Wilmorite properties.

In 1994, Wilmorite announced plans to demolish the main mall structure, leaving the Burlington Coat Factory, Hills, and Caldor stores. Under these plans, the mall itself would be replaced with a power center which would have included an unnamed big box home improvement store and a movie theater operated by Regal Cinemas.

The mall itself closed in 1996, leaving only the Hills store operational until that chain closed in 1999, and was replaced by Ames, which remained open until 2002, and the Burlington, which remained until 2016.

Driver's Village

In early 2000, local area auto dealer Roger Burdick purchased the old mall and proceeded to turn it into an auto mall, known as Driver's Village. With a design by Robertson Strong Apgar Architects, the old Sears and Ames wings were demolished, and the rest of the mall was gutted, save for the hallway and the eastern portion of the newer wing from 1986. Ames closed in 2002 and was turned into a used car showroom. The rest of the mall has been converted into showrooms and service centers for 16 auto brands.

Retail is still present in Driver's Village which includes a cafe, a catering company, children's party location, as well as real estate, insurance, financial and tax service offices.  Aspen Athletic Club and the Greater Syracuse Sports Hall of Fame are also located there.

Manufacturers
There are currently 16 new car franchises connected to the main building at Driver's Village. These include Audi, Buick, Chevrolet, Chrysler, Dodge, Fiat, GMC, Jeep, Kia, Lincoln, Mazda, Mitsubishi, Nissan, Porsche, Ram and Volkswagen.  Additionally, there are four franchises in separate buildings on the property: BMW, Hyundai, Lexus and Toyota.

References

External links
 Tribute site to the mall 
 Driver's Village
 Robertson Strong Apgar Architects

Shopping malls in New York (state)
Defunct shopping malls in the United States
Buildings and structures in Onondaga County, New York
Shopping malls established in 1976
Auto rows